Armandas Kučys (born 27 February 2003) is a Lithuanian football player. He plays for the Under-19 squad of the Swedish club Oskarshamns AIK, on loan from Kalmar FF.

International career
He made his debut for Lithuania national football team on 15 November 2021 in a friendly against Kuwait.

Personal life
His father Aurimas Kučys is a former Lithuanian international footballer.

References

External links
 
 

2003 births
Living people
Lithuanian footballers
Lithuanian expatriate footballers
Lithuania youth international footballers
Lithuania international footballers
Association football forwards
FK Panevėžys players
FK Ekranas players
Kalmar FF players
Oskarshamns AIK players
Ettan Fotboll players
Expatriate footballers in Sweden
Lithuanian expatriate sportspeople in Sweden